Michael Morrice  (born July 22, 1984) is a Canadian politician serving as the member of Parliament (MP) for Kitchener Centre since 2021. A member of the Green Party, Morrice was elected to the House of Commons in the 2021 federal election, becoming the party's first MP elected in Ontario and the second elected outside of British Columbia.

Early life and career
Morrice grew up on Montreal's West Island until 1997 when his family relocated to Newmarket, Ontario. In 2003 he enrolled at Wilfrid Laurier University where he received a dual degree in business and computer electronics. Following his university studies, Morrice focused on green ventures and sustainable economics, he founded Sustainable Waterloo Region in 2008 and later Green Economy Canada in 2013.

Politics
Morrice was selected as the Green Party's candidate in the 2019 federal election for Kitchener Centre. Morrice lost to incumbent Liberal MP Raj Saini, but increased the Green Party's vote share from 3 per cent to 26 per cent. Morrice later revealed that he was diagnosed with cancer during his 2019 campaign.

2021 election 
While serving an eight-month term as a social entrepreneur in residence at Wilfrid Laurier University, Morrice took leave from his position to run in the 2021 federal election, again running against Saini, who later faced multiple counts of sexual harassment from staffers. Saini ended his campaign, though he remained on the ballot because it was after the candidate nomination deadline, and prominent Liberals in the region put their support behind Morrice. On election day, Morrice was elected to Parliament with 34 per cent of the vote.

Electoral record

Notes

References

External links

1984 births
21st-century Canadian politicians
Ashoka Canada Fellows
Canadian Mennonites
Green Party of Canada MPs
Living people
Members of the House of Commons of Canada from Ontario
Politicians from Kitchener, Ontario
Rotary International leaders
Wilfrid Laurier University alumni